Union Bulldogs can refer to the athletic program of either of the following U.S. colleges and universities:
 Union University, an NCAA Division II institution in Jackson, Tennessee
 Union College, an NAIA institution in Barbourville, Kentucky